The women's 4 × 400 metres relay event at the 2021 European Athletics U23 Championships was held in Tallinn, Estonia, at Kadriorg Stadium on 11 July.

Records
Prior to the competition, the records were as follows:

Results

Round 1
Qualification rule:  First 3 in each heat (Q) and the next 2 fastest (q) advance to the Final.

Final

References

Relay 4 x 400
Relays at the European Athletics U23 Championships